Bunty I Love You is a Pakistani drama serial directed by Siraj-ul-Haque , written by Khalil-Ur-Rehman Qamar & produced by Momina Duraid under the production Momina Duraid Productions. The drama was aired from 29 December 2013 to 18 May 2014 on Hum TV.

The show was selected to on air on Hum Europe from 13 November 2016 at 9pm and is also streaming on ZEE5.

Plot

Dania is a young girl married at 17 to a much older man Patel. Patel dies 12 years later but not before leaving half of his property to Dania. Dania dreams of living a free life until she hits a mobile phone snatcher, Bunty, who is much younger than her. She takes him to the hospital, spends a lot of money on his treatment, and falls for him. She wants him to love her so they can marry and live happily. Dania hints that she loves Bunty, but he doesn't realise it yet.

Bunty doesn't realise that Dania loves him, so he keeps flirting with other girls. He falls for Mehwish, his best friend's sister. They both start planning their marriage. Bunty takes Dania to Mehwish's house when Dania finds out that Mehwish is not interested in Bunty but in the money. She buys Bunty from Mehwish and gives proof to Bunty.

Bunty falls for Beenish, who teaches him English although she is younger than him. They both start dating until one day, Dania finds out. Dania sends cops to Beenish's house, so Bunty runs from there. That night Dania asks Bunty what he was doing at Beenish's home; he again lies, not knowing that Dania knows the truth.

Dania always gives Bunty clues about her love, but he doesn't get them. He goes to the beach, where he meets a girl named Sehrish. Bunty proposes to her, but she declines. Sehrish tells Bunty that he loves Dania but does not know it yet. Sehrish tells Bunty to go and propose to Dania instead.
Bunty goes home and proposes to Dania. Dania does not believe him and thinks he is joking. Dania asks Bunty if he can drink poison for her. Bunty agrees and consumes poison. Shocked, Dania keeps repeating "Bunty I Love You" till he dies of poisoning, leaving Dania alone again.

Cast 
 Saba Qamar as Dania
 Noman Habib as Bunty
 Abid Ali as Patel 
 Saboor Ali as Mehwish
 Azfar Rehman 
 Mehar Bano as Beenish
 Mehmood Akhtar
 Raza Zaidi
 Khawaja Saleem
 Tariq Jameel
 Mariam Ansari
 Hina Rizvi as Mehnaz
 Anita Camphor
 Munawar Saeed

Soundtrack 
The Original Soundtrack of Bunty I Love You "Mein Tumse Kis Tarah Keh Doon" has been sung by Faiza Mujahid and music is composed by Waqar Ali.

Accolades

References

External links 
 
 
https://www.hum.tv/dramas/bunty-i-love-you/

Hum TV original programming
Urdu-language television shows
Pakistani drama television series
2013 Pakistani television series debuts